EVM may refer to:
 Earned value management in project management 
 Electronic voting machine
 EnviroMission, an Australian energy company
 Error Vector Magnitude, measure of radio transmission/reception 
 Estonian Open Air Museum
 Ethereum Virtual Machine, cryptocurrency scripting
 Ethnoveterinary medicine
 Environmental Science , Studies